Go Off may refer to:
"Go Off" (M.I.A. song), single by M.I.A. from the album AIM, 2016
"Go Off" (Lil Uzi Vert, Quavo and Travis Scott song), song from the 2017 soundtrack The Fate of the Furious: The Album
Go Off!, album by Cacophony, 1988
"Go Off", single by Aasim, 2008
"Go Off", song by DJ Kay Slay and Greg Street from the album The Champions: North Meets South, 2006
"Go Off", song by Hustle Gang from the album We Want Smoke, 2017
"Go Off", single by Jarren Benton from the album My Grandma's Basement, 2013
"Go Off", single by KB from the album Weight & Glory, 2012
"Go Off (Nuthin’ 2 It)", song by Dillon Francis from the 2019 mixtape Magic Is Real